East Germany (German Democratic Republic) competed at the Winter Olympic Games for the last time at the 1988 Winter Olympics in Calgary, Alberta, Canada.  Following German reunification in 1990, a single German team would compete in the 1992 Winter Olympics.

Medalists

Competitors
The following is the list of number of competitors in the Games.

Biathlon

Men

Men's 4 x 7.5 km relay

 1 A penalty loop of 150 metres had to be skied per missed target.
 2 One minute added per missed target.

Bobsleigh

Cross-country skiing

Men

 C = Classical style, F = Freestyle

Women

 C = Classical style, F = Freestyle

Women's 4 × 5 km relay

Figure skating

Men

Women

Pairs

Luge

Men

(Men's) Doubles

Women

Nordic combined 

Men's individual

Events:
 normal hill ski jumping 
 15 km cross-country skiing 

Men's Team

Three participants per team.

Events:
 normal hill ski jumping 
 10 km cross-country skiing

Ski jumping

Speed skating

Men

Women

References

Official Olympic Reports
International Olympic Committee results database
 Olympic Winter Games 1988, full results by sports-reference.com

Germany, East
1988
Winter Olympics
1988 in German sport